Janel Gauthier is a Canadian psychologist with expertise in clinical psychology, human rights and ethics.

Career
He received his doctorate in psychology from Queen's University at Kingston, Ontario, Canada, in 1975.  He spent most of his academic career at Laval University, Quebec City from which he retired as Professor Emeritus.

He has served extensively on national, regional and international organizations of psychology.

Research
His research and practice has had two main themes.  The first has been the use of behavioural, cognitive, and social psychology in the treatment of anxiety and mood disorders, the enhancement of low social self-esteem and the management of grief reactions and chronic headaches. The second has been ethics and human rights. He led the development of the Universal Declaration of Ethical Principles for Psychologists which was adopted by the International Union of Psychological Science and the International Association of Applied Psychology in 2008.

Publications
 Gauthier, J.G.,  Anne‐Louise Fournier, A.-L., &  Claude Roberge, C.(1991). The Differential Effects of Biofeedback in the Treatment of Menstrual and Nonmenstrual Migraine, Headache.
 Gauthier, J., Cote, G., & French, D. (1994). The role of home practice in the thermal biofeedback treatment of migraine headache. Journal of consulting and clinical psychology.
 Gauthier, J. (2009). Ethical principles and human rights: Building a better world globally. Counselling Psychology Quarterly.

Other activities
Gauthier has been active in Taekwon-Do in which he holds a Black belt.

Positions
 President, International Association of Applied Psychology(IAAP)
 1997-1999: President, Canadian Psychological Association

Awards
 2013: Interamerican Psychology Award for Distinguished Contributions to the Development of Psychology as a Science and as a Profession in the Americas, Interamerican Psychological Society
 2015: Outstanding International Psychologist Award, American Psychological Association, Division 52 (International Psychology)
 2016: Fukuhara Award for Distinguished Contributions to the International Community of Professional Associations and the Discipline of Psychology, International Council of Psychologists
 Fellow, Canadian Psychological Association

References

Canadian psychologists
20th-century Canadian psychologists
Living people
Clinical psychologists
Academic staff of Université Laval
Year of birth missing (living people)
Presidents of the Canadian Psychological Association